The Climbers may refer to:

 The Climbers (band), a British band
 The Climbers (1915 film), a lost 1915 silent film
 The Climbers (1919 film), a 1919 silent film
 The Climbers (1927 film), a lost 1927 silent film
 The Climbers (2019 film), a film directed by Daniel Lee with a guest appearance by Jackie Chan

See also 
 Climber (disambiguation)